The Lennox River is the proposed name for a waterway located in Sydney's South-Western Suburbs. The existing waterway is the tidal reach of Prospect Creek, a tributary of the Georges River. A proposal has been made to upgrade and reclassify the waterway as a 'river'. The proposed river would be 6.5 kilometres (4 mi) long, starting at the confluence of Orphan School Creek and Prospect Creek at Fairfield and flowing to the Georges River emptying into Dhurawal Bay at Garrison Point.

The Lennox River would be named in honour of Scottish-Australian stonemason David Lennox who designed and oversaw the construction of the Lansdowne Bridge which crosses this waterway. The proposal to re-gazette this waterway was put forward by Community Advocate Lachlan Hyde to upgrade this waterway to river status. Local elected representatives including State Members of Parliament have given their support to the proposal and have pushed the New South Wales Government in support of this matter.

The catchment area of the proposed Lennox River is largely urbanised with residential land uses and open space for recreation.

Geography 
From its source at the confluence of Orphan School Creek and Prospect Creek at Fairfield, the tidal section of Prospect Creek (the proposed Lennox River) flows generally south by southeast, through the suburbs of Canley Vale, Carramar, and Lansvale in the Fairfield local government area, as well as Lansdowne, and Georges Hall in the Canterbury-Bankstown local government area. The creek then empties into the Georges River at Dhurawal Bay which forms part of the Chipping Norton Lakes Precinct.

The creek winds through a number of parks and reserves, with the most prominent ones being, Parkes Reserve and Cook Park in Canley Vale, Waterside Crescent Reserve and Carrawood Park in Carramar, Lansvale Park and the Liverpool Golf Course in Lansvale, Mirambeena Regional Park which comprises Shortland Brush and Flinders Slopes in Lansdowne, and Garrison Point Reserve in Georges Hall.

Along the creek route are three bridge crossings:

 Carramar (Sandal Crescent) Railway Bridge which was constructed when the Main South Line was extended from Regents Park to Cabramatta in 1924.
 Waterside Crescent Pedestrian Bridge which connects Cook Park in Canley Vale to Carrawood Park in Carramar.
 Historic Lansdowne Bridge which was designed by David Lennox and opened in 1836, the sandstone arch bridge has the largest span of any masonry bridge in Australia and still carries the northbound traffic of the Hume Highway today.

Etymology 
The proposed 'Lennox River' name is chosen in honour of Scottish-Australian stonemason David Lennox who was a colonial bridge designer, builder, and master stonemason and a figure of significance having worked on a number of bridge and infrastructure works including the 1833 Mitchell's Pass Crossing Bridge in Glenbrook (Blue Mountains), 1836 Liverpool Weir, 1839 Church Street Bridge in Parramatta and other projects in both Greater Western Sydney and also to the state of New South Wales.

Lennox's finest structure however was the Lansdowne Bridge (which crosses this waterway), he designed and oversaw its construction between 1834 and 1836 and as a testament to his engineering and craftsmanship the Hume Highway from Sydney to Melbourne still passes over the bridge today. The bridge also has the largest span of any masonry bridge in Australia and is considered one of the finest examples of colonial architecture in the nation.

David Lennox today while forgotten by many is someone who was integral to the development of New South Wales through his position as Superintendent of Bridges, the proposed Lennox River is said to be a fitting tribute acknowledging his links to Greater Western Sydney while also honouring his legacy. A living memorial through a thriving river system which is particularly notable given his gravestone was never marked and as such no public memorial exists for people to honour Lennox's achievements, life, and career.

The name Lennox is also of Scottish Gaelic origin and is typically defined as "with many trees" or "among elm trees", the reference of trees within the name also complements the river parkland environment due to the many tall and shady trees providing greenery and canopy cover for South Western Sydney.

Campaign for reclassification 

What began as a grassroots by community advocate Lachlan Hyde, the campaign to upgrade and reclassify Prospect Creek's tidal reach to 'river status' captured the minds of both the community and local elected representatives with many publicly endorsing the plan including:

 Guy Zangari (State Member for Fairfield): Mr Zangari announced his support in the NSW Parliament saying "I look forward to this stretch of Prospect Creek receiving an upgrade to river status and to [be] able to refer to it as the Lennox River, a name change that is overdue and eagerly anticipated by the residents of Fairfield."
 Tania Mihailuk (State Member for Bankstown): Ms Mihailuk spoke on Channel 9 News saying "The idea of renaming it and also reclassifying it does give us an opportunity to [really] put this place on the map."
 Nick Lalich (State Member for Cabramatta): Mr Lalich is also supportive of the Lennox River proposal expressing his support in the Fairfield City Champion.
 Wendy Lindsay (State Member for East Hills): Ms Lindsay announced her support for the Lennox River on her Facebook page saying "[There has been] a tremendous amount of research completed regarding this proposal and I'm pleased to support it."]

In the NSW Parliament it was also noted by Mr Zangari that local residents have always referred to this stretch of water as a river with "many [people] surprised that this proposal had not been considered a long time ago [especially considering] Prospect Creek shares the same characteristics as a river being wide, deep and navigable by watercraft".

Speaking with the Fairfield City Champion, community advocate Lachlan Hyde said "this is very much a thriving river system matching the legal definition of a river [as currently it] is very much [a creek] in name only with the waterway over 25 metres wide". Mr Hyde added that in New South Wales a river is defined as a 'major natural stream in a large catchment basin, carrying water to another river, a lake or the sea', whereas a creek is only a 'natural watercourse that is usually a tributary and in some areas it may even peter out'.

Recreation 
Historically the lower Prospect Creek was a large part of life for residents in the Fairfield local government area with numerous pleasure grounds and recreation spaces along the river including Latty's Pleasure Grounds, the Butterfly Hall, and Hollywood Park. These venues were quite popular among 'leisure seekers" and tourists due to the area's rural feel and close proximately to the waterway, so popular in fact that the first games of Rugby League football in Australia, in early 1908, were trial games that took place in Lansvale, at Latty's Pleasure Grounds.

From the 1970s to 1990s, a small amusement park named Magic Kingdom operated in Lansvale on the banks of the creek and was a popular attraction for children, families, and thrill-seekers. Magic Kingdom had a number of rides and water activities including bungy jumping, mini-boats, water slides, picnic areas and barbecue facilities. By the mid-1990s Magic Kingdom was facing competition from other amusement parks such as Australia's Wonderland and subsequently closed with the attractions left to rot and rust before being sold to developers where the land has remained dormant ever since.

Over time the creek has also slowly lost its shine as successive governments and communities turned their backs on the waterway, this coupled with industrialisation occurring upstream led to the declining water quality which is reflected in warnings today from authorities to avoid swimming in the catchment as it is not recommended.

Today there are walkways and cycling paths that parallel the Lennox River, with the longest continuous walking path running the majority of the proposed river route. Starting at Cook Park in Canley Vale, before crossing the river into Carramar's Carrawood Park the path continues to the Lansdowne Bridge and Hume Highway then passes through Shortland Brush and Flinders Slopes in Mirambeena Regional Park before finishing in Garrison Point Reserve at Georges Hall. The walkways and cycling paths are situated within an Australian bushland settings with many native trees such as eucalyptus found by the water's edge.

Boating and fishing are now also popular along the creek with most forms of fishing permitted in the Lennox River subject to bag and size limit regulations. Similarly all vessels are permitted to travel along the Lennox River including jet-skies and boats although a limit of 8 knots is enforced by the relevant authorities. Bull sharks can be found in the waterway as the Georges River is tidal up to the Liverpool Weir, and Lennox River connects below that point.

References

External links 

 

Georges River